Pierce may refer to:

Places

Canada
 Pierce Range, a mountain range on Vancouver Island, British Columbia

United States
 Pierce, Colorado
 Pierce, Idaho
 Pierce, Illinois
 Pierce, Kentucky
 Pierce, Nebraska
 Pierce, Texas
 Pierce, West Virginia
 Pierce, Wisconsin
 Mount Pierce (New Hampshire), a peak in the White Mountains
 Pierce County (disambiguation), several places

Organizations
 Pierce Biotechnology, an American biotechnology company focused on protein biology
 Pierce Manufacturing, an American manufacturer of fire trucks
 Franklin Pierce Law Center, a law school in Concord, New Hampshire
 Franklin Pierce University, a liberal arts college in Rindge, New Hampshire

People
 Pierce (given name)
 Pierce (surname)

Other uses
 Pierce-Arrow Motor Car Company
 Pierce Washington, one of the main characters of Saints Row 2 and Saints Row: The Third
 Pierce oscillator, an electronic oscillator
 Pierce's disease, a grape disease
 Pierce Protein Assay, a method of quantification of protein in biology
 Pierce v. Society of Sisters, a 1925 United States Supreme Court case

See also
 Piercing
 Piers Ploughman
 Peirce (disambiguation)
 Pierse